Senator Cooper may refer to:

Members of the United States Senate
Henry Cooper (U.S. senator) (1827–1884), U.S. Senator from Tennessee 1871 to 1877
James Cooper (Pennsylvania politician) (1810–1863), U.S. Senator from Pennsylvania from 1849 to 1855
John Sherman Cooper (1901–1991), U.S. Senator from Kentucky from 1956 to 1973

United States state senate members
Charles Merian Cooper (1856–1923), Florida State Senate
Daniel C. Cooper (1773–1818), Ohio State Senate
Duncan Brown Cooper (1844–1922), Tennessee State Senate
George B. Cooper (politician) (1808–1866), Michigan State Senate
Henry Allen Cooper (1850–1931), Wisconsin State Senate
Jerry W. Cooper (born 1948), Tennessee State Senate
John Cooper (Arkansas politician) (born 1947), Arkansas State Senate
Prentice Cooper (1895–1969), Tennessee State Senate
Roy Cooper (born 1957), North Carolina State Senate
Samuel B. Cooper (1850–1918), Texas State Senate
Stan Cooper (born 1940), Wyoming State Senate
Thomas Valentine Cooper (1835–1909), Pennsylvania State Senate
Thomas Cooper (American politician, born 1764) (1764–1829), Delaware State Senate